The following is a list of notable deaths in August 1993.

Entries for each day are listed alphabetically by surname. A typical entry lists information in the following sequence:
 Name, age, country of citizenship at birth, subsequent country of citizenship (if applicable), reason for notability, cause of death (if known), and reference.

August 1993

1
Bob Carter, 71, American jazz bassist and arranger.
Claire Du Brey, 100, American actress.
Elmira Gafarova, 59, Azerbaijani politician and diplomat, heart attack.
Ewing Kauffman, 76, American entrepreneur, philanthropist, and baseball executive, bone cancer.
Alfred Manessier, 81, French painter, stained glass artist, and tapestry designer, traffic collision.
Luciano Montero, 85, Spanish road bicycle racer.
Gerry Sundquist, 37, English actor, suicide.

2
Guido del Mestri, 82, Italian cardinal of the Catholic Church.
Nigel Henderson, 84, British admiral in the Royal Navy.
Kamal Mitra, 80, Indian actor.
John Roxburgh, 61, Australian racing driver, and motor sports administrator.
Janusz Sidło, 60, Polish javelin thrower and Olympic medalist.

3
Petr Beckmann, 68, Czechoslovak-American writer and physicist.
Vittorio Badini Confalonieri, 79, Italian politician and lawyer.
James Donald, 76, Scottish actor (The Bridge on the River Kwai, The Great Escape, The Vikings), stomach cancer.
Alwyn Howard Gentry, 48, American botanist and plant collector, plane crash.
Prem Krishna Khanna, 99, Indian revolutionary and politician.
Ernie Norman, 80, Australian rugby player.
Theodore A. Parker III, 40, American ornithologist, plane crash.
Chinmayananda Saraswati, 77, Indian Hindu spiritual leader and teacher.
Mercedes Valdivieso, 69, Chilean writer.

4
Nesmith Ankeny, 66, American mathematician.
Bernard Barrow, 65, American actor (Ryan's Hope, Serpico, Rachel, Rachel), lung cancer.
Kenny Drew, 64, American jazz pianist.
Jack Dwan, 72, American basketball player.
Bob Maier, 77, American baseball player.
John Pickard, 80, American actor (Boots and Saddles, True Grit, Gunslinger), animal attack.
George M. Wallhauser, 93, American politician.

5
Bob Cooper, 67, American jazz musician, heart attack.
Randy Jo Hobbs, 45, American musician, heart failure.
Homer A. Jack, 77, American unitarian clergyman, pacifist and social activist.
Joseph Paul Jernigan, 39, American convicted murderer, execution by lethal injection.
Karin Nellemose, 88, Danish actress.
Bill Peterson, 73, American football player and coach.
Francisco Rúa, 82, Argentine football player.
Eugen Suchoň, 84, Slovak composer.

6
Tex Hughson, 77, American Major League Baseball player.
Bob Kiesel, 81, American sprinter and Olympic champion.
Ben Klassen, 75, American politician and white supremacist religious leader, suicide.
Esad Mekuli, 76, Albanian poet, critic and translator.
Henri Philippe Pharaoun, 92, Lebanese businessman and politician, homicide.
Milton Orville Thompson, 67, American naval officer and NASA test pilot.
Bill Thomson, 79, Canadian ice hockey player.

7
Geert Bakker, 72, Dutch sailor and Olympian.
Roy Budd, 46, British jazz pianist and composer, stroke.
John R. Burke, 68, American ambassador to Guyana during the Jonestown Massacre.
David Fleay, 86, Australian scientist and naturalist.
Charles Maxwell, 79, American actor and producer.
Louis Sheaffer, 80, American journalist and wineer of the Pullitzer Prize, heart failure.

8
Harry Bellaver, 88, American actor, pneumonia.
Nico Habermann, 61, Dutch computer scientist, heart attack.
Roy London, 50, American actor and acting coach, AIDS-related complications.
Andor László, 78, Hungarian economist.

9
Elena Fabrizi, 78, Italian actress and television personality.
Milorad Mitrović, 85, Serbian football player.
Chad Oliver, 65, American anthropologist and science fiction writer.
Ion Vatamanu, 56, Moldovan writer and politician.

10
Audrey Chapman, 94, American silent film era actress.
Ken Englund, 79, American screenwriter.
Euronymous, 25, Norwegian musician, stabbed.
Diana Holman-Hunt, 79, English memoir writer and art critic.
Eva Olmerová, 59, Czech pop and jazz singer, cirrhosis.
David Rogers, 57, American country music artist.
Quincy Trouppe, 80, American baseball player and an amateur boxing champion.

11
Alyn Beals, 72, American gridiron football player.
Agamemnon Gratsios, 71, Greek Army general.
Eysteinn Jónsson, 86, Icelandic politician and minister.
Bill Wilson, 50, American baseball player, cancer.

12
John H. Dessauer, 88, German-American chemical engineer and businessman.
Regina Olson Hughes, 98, American scientific illustrator in botanical art.
Jack Lott, 73, American big game hunter and writer.
George Mason, 79, English football player.

13
Veli Autio, 83, Finnish rower and Olympian.
Jackson Edward Betts, 89, American politician.
Barbara Gibbs Golffing, 80, American poet and translator.
Helene Jacobs, 87, German resistance member during World War II.
Margarita Padín, 83, Argentine actress.
Rodolfo Tommasi, 85, Italian football player.

14
Jiří Adamíra, 67, Czech actor and university educator.
Francis Mankiewicz, 49, Canadian film director, screenwriter and producer, cancer.
André Méric, 80, French politician, traffic collision.
Günther van Well, 70, German diplomat and West German ambassador.

15
Johnny Bratton, 65, American boxing champion.
Arthur Grenfell Clarke, 86, Hong Kong politician.
Patricia St. John, 74, English writer.
Robert Kempner, 93, German-American lawyer.
Kalevi Lilja, 67, Finnish football player.
Hans Nordahl, 75, Norwegian football player.
Nathán Pinzón, 76, Argentine actor, heart attack.

16
Abd al-A'la al-Sabziwari, 81, Iranian-Iraqi Shia Grand Ayatollah.
Jacob D. Beam, 85, American diplomat.
René Dreyfus, 88, French racecar driver.
Ernest Fernyhough, 84, British politician.
Tom Fuccello, 56, American actor (Love Is a Many Splendored Thing, Dallas, Mac and Me), AIDS-related complications.
Stewart Granger, 80, British film actor, cancer.
Joan Hughes, 75, English test pilot and stunt performer.
Kitty Joyner, 77, American electrical engineer with the NACA and NASA.
Irene Sharaff, 83, American costume designer (West Side Story, Cleopatra, An American in Paris), five-time Oscar winner, heart failure.
Ethelwynn Trewavas, 92, British  ichthyologist.

17
Feng Kang, 72, Chinese mathematician.
Robert C. Maynard, 56, American journalist and newspaper publisher, prostate cancer.
Phil Seymour, 41, American musician, lymphoma.
Al Sima, 71, American baseball player.

18
Tony Barwick, 59, British television scriptwriter, cancer.
Daisy Lumini, 57, Italian composer, singer and stage actress, suicide.
Tino Schirinzi, 59, Italian actor and stage director, suicide.
Paweł Stok, 80, Polish basketball player.

19
Lucinda Ballard, 87, American costume designer (The Gay Life, Another Part of the Forest, A Streetcar Named Desire), Tony winner (1947, 1962), cancer.
Iris Faircloth Blitch, 81, American politician.
Utpal Dutt, 64, Indian actor, director, and playwright.
Gérard Hérold, 53, French actor, heart attack.
Salah Jadid, 67, Syrian general and politician, heart attack.
Donald William Kerst, 81, American physicist.

20
Tony Barton, 56, English football player and football manager, heart attack.
Koos de Jong, 81, Dutch sailor and Olympic medalist.
William J. Murphy, 81, American politician.
Reiner Schürmann, 52, German Dominican priest and philosopher, AIDS-related complications.
Viktor Torshin, 45, Russian sport shooter and Olympic medalist.

21
Louis Cools-Lartigue, 88, Dominican politician.
Paula Deubel, 58, American shot putter and Olympian.
Ichirō Fujiyama, 82, Japanese singer and composer.
Kasdi Merbah, 55, Algerian politician, murdered.
Tatiana Troyanos, 54, American mezzo-soprano, breast cancer.

22
Eddie Chiles, 83, American businessman and baseball executive.
Dinmukhamed Konayev, 81, Soviet and Kazakhstan communist politician.
R. Gundu Rao, 56, Indian politician, leukemia .
Halsey Royden, 64, American mathematician,  heart attack.
Yoshiko Shigekane, 66, Japanese writer.

23
Gregory Gaye, 92, Russian-American actor.
Piero Parini, 98, Italian journalist and politician.
Edvard Ravnikar, 85, Slovenian architect.
Charles Scorsese, 80, American actor (Raging Bull, Goodfellas, The Color of Money).

24
George Cansdale, 83, British zoologist, writer and television personality.
Ruben Cantu, 26, American convicted murderer, execution by lethal injection.
Leopoldo Contarbio, 64, Argentine basketball player.
D. B. Deodhar, 101, Indian cricket player.
Boris Levin, 86, Soviet and Russian mathematician.
David Mason, 36, American serial killer, execution by gas chamber.
Albert Joseph McConnell, 89, Irish mathematician and mathematical physicist.

25
Janna Allen, 36, American songwriter, leukemia.
Amy Biehl, 26, American anti-Apartheid activist, homicide.
Tom Gallery, 95, American film actor and sports promoter.
Lawrence Kadoorie, Baron Kadoorie, 94, Hong Kong industrialist, photographer and philanthropist.
Boris Moishezon, 55, Soviet and Russian mathematician, heart attack.
Macauley Smith, 88, American long-distance runner and Olympian.

26
Karl Bewerunge, 80, German politician.
Jean Carmen, 80, American film, stage, and radio actress.
Rockin' Dopsie, 61, American zydeco singer and accordion player, heart attack.
Roy Raymond, 46, American businessman and founder of Victoria's Secret, suicide.
Alan Wharton, 70, English cricket player.

27
Rafael Alcayde, 86, Mexican film actor.
Wolfgang Helck, 78, German egyptologist and writer.
José Marante, 78, Argentine football player.
Gene Thomas, 50, American gridiron football player, cardiomyopathy.
Archie Wilcox, 90, Canadian ice hockey defenceman.

28
George Appleton, 91, British Anglican bishop and writer.
Bernie Baum, 63, American songwriter.
Frank Hill, 87, Scottish football player and manager.
Rene Ray, Countess of Midleton, 81,  British stage and screen actress and novelist.
Paul Rowe, 79, American ice hockey player.
William Stafford, 79, American poet and pacifist.
E. P. Thompson, 69, English historian, writer, socialist and pacifist.

29
Dorian Corey, 56, American drag performer and fashion designer, AIDS-related complications.
Roger McCluskey, 63, American IndyCar racing driver, cancer.
Carlos Santiago Nino, 49, Argentine philosopher, asthma.
Gwendoline Porter, 91, British track and field athlete and Olympic medalist.

30
Ian Folley, 30, English cricket player, heart attack.
Richard Jordan, 56, American actor (Logan's Run, Dune, The Hunt for Red October), brain cancer.
Anthony Plowman, 87, British judge.
Milos Žutić, 53, Serbian actor.

31
Jess Hill, 86, American baseball player, athlete, and coach, Alzheimer's disease.
Stella Kramrish, 97, American art historian and curator.
Stuart Latham, 81, English actor, director and television producer.
Ligorio López, 60, Mexican football player.
Alexander Nekrich, 73, Soviet and Russian historian.
Siegfried Schürenberg, 93, German film actor.
Al Trace, 92, American songwriter and orchestra leader, stroke.

References 

1993-08
 08